= National Institute of Technology, Lahore =

Private university in Lahore, Pakistan

National Institute of Technology University
- Type: Private
- Established: 25 January 2025; 18 months ago
- Founders: Shahzeb Awan; Jahanzeb Burana
- Affiliations: HEC, ASU
- Vice-Chancellor: Dr. Cagri Bagcioglu
- Location: Lahore, Punjab, Pakistan
- Website: www.nit.edu.pk

The National Institute of Technology (Urdu: نیشنل انسٹیٹیوٹ آف ٹیکنالوجی), abbreviated as NIT, is a private university located in Lahore, Punjab, Pakistan.

== Description ==
The university was established through a charter granted by the Government of Pakistan on 25 January 2025. It was founded by Shahzeb Awan, a University of London alumnus, and Jahanzeb Burana, a Harvard alumnus. Dr. Çağrı Bağcıoğlu serves as its vice chancellor.

It is created in partnership with Arizona State University. The partnership was officially signed at a ceremony held at Arizona State University’s campus in Tempe on 16 April 2025. It will offer programmes mirroring those offered at Arizona State University.

It will commence operations in October 2025.

== Organisation and administration ==
The university is headed by a chancellor, with a vice-chancellor as chief executive of academic and administrative affairs. Muhammad Shahzeb Awan, one of the university's two co-founders, serves as chancellor. In late November 2025, Guinness World Records recognised Awan, then aged 29, as the youngest male university chancellor in the world.

== Academics ==
NIT opened to its first cohort in October 2025 with two schools, the School of Management Sciences and the School of Data Sciences and Information Technology. A School of Social Sciences was subsequently added. As of 2026 the university lists undergraduate programmes across three schools, together with four graduate programmes.

- School of Data Science and Information Technology — undergraduate programmes in computer science, data science and business analytics, software engineering, artificial intelligence, cybersecurity, and computer engineering.
- School of Management Sciences — undergraduate programmes in accounting and finance, international business, entrepreneurial leadership, supply chain management, and management science.
- School of Social Sciences — undergraduate programmes in economics and finance, economics and political science, economics and mathematics, and psychology.

Graduate offerings comprise a Master of Business Administration, an MS in computer science, an MS in artificial intelligence in business, and a Master of Global Management.

NIT participates in the ASU–Cintana alliance, a network of partner institutions across approximately 30 countries. Under the Arizona State University partnership, students may complete part of a degree at NIT and part at ASU, via a three-plus-one undergraduate dual-degree route, a four-plus-one accelerated master's route, or a one-plus-one graduate dual-degree route.

The Higher Education Commission lists NIT as a recognised private-sector university in Punjab.
